Gül Baba is a 1940 Hungarian musical film directed by Kálmán Nádasdy and starring Sándor Kömíves, Zita Szeleczky and Pál Jávor. It was based on the operetta Gül Baba composed by Jenő Huszka with a libretto by Ferenc Martos.

Cast
 Sándor Kömíves - Gül Baba
 Zita Szeleczky - Leila, Gül Baba lánya
 Pál Jávor - Gábor diák
 Zoltán Makláry - Mujkó cigány
 Margit Ladomerszky - Mujkóné
 Judit Farkas - Cigánylány
 Nándor Bihary - Ali basa
 Karola Szalay - Georgiai hercegnõ
 Mária Fáskuty - Zulejka
 Gyula Tapolczay - Zulfikár
 Márton Rátkai - Kádi
 Imre Toronyi - Kovácsmester
 György Kürthy - Budai bíró
 Dóra Fáy Kiss - Csaplároslány
 Lajos Kelemen (actor) - Fõhóhér
 Elemér Baló - Zarándokvezetõ
 György Gonda - Aga
 Zoltán Várkonyi - Student
 János Pásztor (actor) - Student
 Lajos Rajczy - Student
 Jenõ Szabó - Student
 Miklós Szabó - Student
 Gyula Terney - Student
 Sándor Illyés - Student
 Kálmán Hetényi - Student
 Tihamér Lázár - Student
 Antal Péterffy - Student

External links

1940 films
1940 musical films
Hungarian musical films
1940s Hungarian-language films
Films based on operas
Films directed by Kálmán Nádasdy
Films set in the 16th century
Hungarian black-and-white films